Mititelu is a Romanian surname. Notable people with the surname include:

 Christian Mititelu (born 1944), Romanian journalist
 Gheorghe Mititelu (born 1934), Romanian chess player

Romanian-language surnames